The 2011 World Wheelchair Curling Championship was held in Prague, Czech Republic from February 22 - March 1, 2011. Ten mixed gender teams competed for four playoff spots. In the final, Canada's Jim Armstrong defeated Scotland's Aileen Neilson in the final in 7 ends. Teams also gained qualification points from this event for the 2014 Winter Paralympic Games in Sochi.

Qualification
  (Host country)
 Top seven finishers from the 2009 World Wheelchair Curling Championship:
  
  
  
  
 
  
  
 Top teams from qualifying event:

Qualification event

Two teams outside of the top seven finishers qualified from a qualifying event held in November 2010 in Lohja, Finland.

Teams
The teams are as listed below:

Standings
Final round-robin standings

Results
All times local (Central European Time)

Draw 1
Tuesday, February 22, 9:30am

Draw 2
Tuesday, February 22, 2:30pm

Draw 3
Wednesday, February 23, 9:30am

Draw 4
Wednesday, February 23, 2:30pm

Draw 5
Thursday, February 24, 9:30am

Draw 6
Thursday, February 24, 2:30pm

Draw 7
Friday, February 25, 9:30am

Draw 8
Friday, February 25, 2:30pm

Draw 9
Saturday, February 26, 9:30am

Draw 10
Saturday, February 26, 2:30pm

Draw 11
Sunday, February 27, 9:30am

Draw 12
Sunday, February 27, 2:30pm

Challenge Games
Monday, February 28, 9:30am

Monday, February 28, 2:30pm

Playoffs

1 vs. 2
Monday, February 28, 2:30pm

3 vs. 4
Monday, February 28, 2:30pm

Semifinal
Tuesday, March 1, 9:30am

Bronze-medal game
Tuesday, March 1, 2:30pm

Gold-medal game
Tuesday, March 1, 2:30pm

Final standings
The final standings of the tournament.

References

External links
Official site
Official Event Information by World Curling Federation

World Wheelchair Curling Championship, 2011
World Wheelchair Curling Championship
International curling competitions hosted by the Czech Republic